This is a round-up of the 1983 Sligo Senior Football Championship. St. Mary's were champions again, regaining the title they had lost to Tourlestrane the previous year. Any hopes of the Sligo town club being kept off the top spot were dashed after they gained an emphatic revenge on holders Tourlestrane in the opening round, and enjoyed a comfortable win over Tubbercurry in the final. This was the first of five successive final meetings between the two clubs.

Quarter finals

Semi-finals

Sligo Senior Football Championship Final

References

 Sligo Champion (August–September 1983)

Sligo Senior Football Championship
Sligo Senior Football Championship